Lászlo Szücs is a Hungarian Olympic boxer. He represented his country in the light-welterweight division at the 1992 Summer Olympics. He won his first bout against Trevor Shailer, his second bout against Daniel Fulanse, and then lost his third bout to Jyri Kjäll.

References

1969 births
Living people
Hungarian male boxers
Olympic boxers of Hungary
Boxers at the 1992 Summer Olympics
Light-welterweight boxers